Norival Pereira da Silva (born 5 June 1917, date of death unknown), known as just Norival, was a Brazilian footballer. He played in 20 matches for the Brazil national football team from 1940 to 1946. He was also part of Brazil's squad for the 1942 South American Championship.

References

External links
 

1917 births
Year of death missing
Brazilian footballers
Brazil international footballers
Place of birth missing
Association footballers not categorized by position